Indomitable Will: LBJ in the Presidency is a biography of Lyndon Baines Johnson by  Mark K. Updegrove, published in 2012.

Plot summary
Indomitable Will is a compilation of original interviews, personal accounts and recollections of individuals who knew, worked with and for President Lyndon Johnson during his five years as President of the United States. Sources include the Reverend Billy Graham, Carl Bernstein, Liz Carpenter, George H. W. Bush, Walter Mondale, Harry J. Middleton, Rose Kennedy, Gerald R. Ford, Helen Thomas, Ted Kennedy, and Bill Moyers, who served as White House Press Secretary in the Johnson Administration.

The book focuses on the extensive legislation passed during Johnson’s Presidency and includes photographs, transcripts from his telephone conversations, and previously unpublished documents.

The author is a Presidential historian who has written two additional non-fiction works based on the lives of American Presidents: Baptism by Fire: Eight Presidents Who Took Office in Times of Crisis (2009), and Second Acts: Presidential Lives and Legacies After the White House (2006).

References

External links
http://www.postandcourier.com/article/20120520/PC1201/120529960/1003/updegrove-chronicles-the-course-of-lbj-s-remarkable-presidency-in-indomitable-will May 20, 2012
http://www.chron.com/news/houston-texas/article/Stories-offer-unique-perspective-of-LBJ-3516320.php May 19, 2012
http://blog.laptopmag.com/enhanced-indomitable-will-e-book-reveals-the-true-lbj May 9, 2012
http://www.dallasnews.com/entertainment/books/20120427-lyndon-b.-johnson-biography-sympathizes-with-the-36th-president.ece April 27, 2012
http://www.eyeonbooks.com/interviews/mark-updegrove-indomitable-will/ April 26, 2012
http://www.kansan.com/news/2012/apr/24/other-side-lyndon-b-johnson/ April 24, 2012
http://livingthedream.org/2012/04/07/ltd-podcast-mark-updegrove-author-of-indomitable-will-lbj-in-the-presidency/ April 7, 2012
http://www.statesman.com/life/books/lbj-books-offer-different-takes-on-nov-22-2289605.html April 7, 2012
http://www.mysanantonio.com/entertainment/books/article/LBJ-oral-history-holds-surprises-3427962.php March 23, 2012
http://www.buffalonews.com/entertainment/gusto/books/book-reviews/article766335.ece March 19, 2012
http://alcalde.texasexes.org/2012/02/cruel-to-be-kind-lbj-behind-the-scenes/ February 28, 2012

2012 non-fiction books
American biographies
Books about Lyndon B. Johnson
Biographies about politicians
Crown Publishing Group books

ru:Здесь курят (роман)